Reinaldo Rosa dos Santos (born 1 July 1976), commonly known as Reinaldo, is a retired Brazilian footballer who played as a forward.

International career
Reinaldo played five games at the 1995 FIFA World Youth Championship, scoring a hat-trick in his country's 6-0 win over Syria.

Career statistics

Club

Notes

References

1976 births
Living people
Brazilian footballers
Brazilian expatriate footballers
Association football forwards
Clube Atlético Mineiro players
R.S.C. Anderlecht players
Sociedade Esportiva Palmeiras players
Hellas Verona F.C. players
Cruzeiro Esporte Clube players
Botafogo de Futebol e Regatas players
Clube Atlético Bragantino players
Associação Portuguesa de Desportos players
Associação Atlética Ponte Preta players
Ceará Sporting Club players
Club Athletico Paranaense players
Sociedade Esportiva do Gama players
Sport Club do Recife players
Al-Arabi SC (Qatar) players
Club Guaraní players
Joinville Esporte Clube players
América Futebol Clube (RN) players
Ceilândia Esporte Clube players
Esporte Clube Bahia players
Vila Nova Futebol Clube players
Campeonato Brasileiro Série A players
Belgian Pro League players
Serie A players
Qatar Stars League players
Paraguayan Primera División players
Brazilian expatriate sportspeople in Belgium
Expatriate footballers in Belgium
Brazilian expatriate sportspeople in Italy
Expatriate footballers in Italy
Brazilian expatriate sportspeople in Qatar
Expatriate footballers in Qatar
Brazilian expatriate sportspeople in Paraguay
Expatriate footballers in Paraguay
Footballers from Belo Horizonte